Gliophorus laetus is a species of agaric fungus in the family Hygrophoraceae. Originally described as new to science by Christian Hendrik Persoon in 1800, it was transferred to the genus Gliophorus in 1958. It is considered edible, but of little interest.

References

External links

Edible fungi
Hygrophoraceae
Fungi described in 1800
Fungi of Europe
Taxa named by Christiaan Hendrik Persoon